Alliston Airport  is located  northeast of Alliston, Ontario, Canada.

It is located north of Toronto between Georgian Bay and Lake Simcoe.

References

Registered aerodromes in Ontario